Franceska Toro (born 1993 in Toa Baja) is a Puerto Rican beauty pageant titleholder who was crowned Miss Earth Puerto Rico 2014 and represented Puerto Rico at Miss Earth 2014.

Pageantry

Miss Mundo de Puerto Rico 2014
Franceska competed in Miss Mundo de Puerto Rico 2014, representing Toa Baja, where finished as 1st Runner-Up, giving her the right to represent Puerto Rico at Miss Earth 2014 in November. She was the first Puerto Rican representative for Miss Earth from Miss Mundo Puerto Rico franchise spearheaded by Shanira Blanco. She had also placed 1st Runner-Up at Miss Mundo de Puerto Rico the prior year.

Miss Earth 2014
Toro later represented Puerto Rico at Miss Earth 2014 in Diliman, Quezon City, Philippines where she received 3 bronze medals for Darling of the Press, Cocktail wear, and Resort Wear and was also awarded with Miss Psalmstre and Miss Advance. However she failed to place in the Top 16.

The pageant was won by Jamie Herrell of the Philippines.

References

1993 births
Living people
Miss Earth 2014 contestants
Puerto Rican beauty pageant winners
People from Toa Baja, Puerto Rico